The discography of American rapper and record producer B.o.B consists of seven studio albums, five compilation albums, three extended plays (EPs), 26 mixtapes, 51 singles (including 29 as a featured artist), 14 promotional singles, and 76 music videos.

B.o.B released his debut album, B.o.B Presents: The Adventures of Bobby Ray, on April 27, 2010. Upon its release, he became the thirteenth male solo artist, to have a debut album arrive at number one on the US Billboard 200. B.o.B quickly rose to fame, after his commercial debut single, "Nothin' on You" (featuring Bruno Mars). The song reached at number one in both the United States and the United Kingdom. He would later release his third single, "Airplanes" (featuring Hayley Williams), which also topped several music charts. The album's fifth single, "Magic" (featuring Rivers Cuomo), became his third top ten hit on the US Billboard Hot 100. B.o.B's debut studio album, which was preceded by two EPs and several mixtapes, was eventually Gold by the Recording Industry Association of America (RIAA).

B.o.B released his second studio album, Strange Clouds, on May 1, 2012. Strange Clouds spawned six singles, four of which all charted well internationally. "Strange Clouds" (featuring Lil Wayne), the album's eponymous lead single, became his fourth top ten hit on the Billboard Hot 100 chart. The singles "So Good", "Both of Us" and "Out of My Mind" (featuring Nicki Minaj), followed behind, with the former two being Platinum by the Recording Industry Association of America (RIAA). The album itself debuted at number five on the US Billboard 200.

B.o.B released his third studio album, Underground Luxury, on December 17, 2013. The album was supported by five singles, namely "We Still in This Bitch" (featuring T.I. and Juicy J), "HeadBand" (featuring 2 Chainz), "Ready" (featuring Future), "John Doe" and "Throwback" (featuring Chris Brown). In 2017, he released his recent album Ether on May 12, 2017, which was his first independent album released through his own label No Genre.

Studio albums

Compilation albums

EPs

Mixtapes

Singles

As lead artist

As featured artist

Promotional singles

Other charted songs

Guest appearances

Music videos

As lead artist

As featured artist

See also 
 B.o.B production discography

Notes 

A  "I'll Be in the Sky" did not enter the Hot R&B/Hip-Hop Songs chart, but peaked at number 5 on the Bubbling Under Hot R&B/Hip-Hop Singles chart.
B  "So High" did not enter the Billboard Hot 100, but peaked at number 25 on the Bubbling Under Hot 100 Singles chart.
C  "Price Tag" did not enter the Hot R&B/Hip-Hop Songs chart, but peaked at number 1 on the Bubbling Under R&B/Hip-Hop Singles chart.
D  "Play the Guitar" did not enter the Hot R&B/Hip-Hop Songs chart, but peaked at number 13 on the Bubbling Under Hot R&B/Hip-Hop Singles chart.
E  "Where Are You (B.o.B vs. Bobby Ray)" did not enter the Billboard Hot 100, but peaked at number 1 on the Bubbling Under Hot 100 Singles chart.
F  "So Hard to Breathe" did not enter the Billboard Hot 100, but peaked at number 1 on the Bubbling Under Hot 100 Singles chart.
G  "Beast Mode" did not enter the Hot R&B/Hip-Hop Songs chart, but peaked at number 20 on the Bubbling Under Hot R&B/Hip-Hop Singles chart.
H  "Arena" did not enter the Billboard Hot 100, but peaked at number 16 on the Bubbling Under Hot 100 Singles chart.
I  "4 Lit" did not enter the Hot R&B/Hip-Hop Songs chart, but peaked at number 32 on the Mainstream R&B/Hip Hop chart.

References

External links
 
 
 

 
 
 
Hip hop discographies
Discographies of American artists
Pop music discographies